Charles Nicoletti (December 3, 1916 – March 29, 1977), also known as "Chuckie the Typewriter", was an American mobster of the Chicago Outfit, who served as hitman under boss Sam Giancana before and after Giancana's rise and fall. Nicoletti was murdered on March 29, 1977.

Early life
Nicoletti was born on December 3, 1916, in Chicago. He was the second son of two sons to Philip Nicoletti and Grace Alessi, Italian immigrants from Santa Caterina Villarmosa, Sicily, Italy. His family lived in Near West Side, Chicago. On February 25, 1929, at the age of 12, Nicoletti shot his father four times, allegedly in self-defense. His father who was a drunkard, attacked Charles and pursued him with a knife, he ran into his father's room, where a gun was kept in a bureau drawer. Two days later, Nicoletti was exonerated by the Cook County coroner. He dropped out of school in eighth grade and soon joined the Forty-Two Gang. At the time, the gang's members included such future Outfit members as Giancana, Sam "Teets" Battaglia, Lew Farrell, "Mad Sam" DeStefano and William "Willie Potatoes" Daddano.

Outfit assassin
By the late 1950s, along with Felix Alderisio, Nicoletti was one of the most feared triggermen in Chicago and was drawing attention from the Federal Bureau of Investigation and the Chicago police. A number of times Nicoletti and Alderisio teamed up for a "hit", including one occasion on which they were discovered by police sitting on the floor in a car later dubbed "the hitmobile" by reporters. This car had special compartments where guns were stored and special switches to turn lights off at certain times. When questioned by police the two said they were "waiting for a friend".

In 1962, Nicoletti took part in an infamous torture case. He, Alderisio, Carlo "Duke" Olandese and Tony "the Ant" Spilotro, had kidnapped 24-year-old Billy McCarthy, a thug who had killed two Outfit associates with the help of Jimmy Miraglia, also age 24. The three men started torturing McCarthy to find out the name of his accomplice. Spilotro had placed the man's head in an industrial vise and started squeezing it tighter and tighter. Suddenly, McCarthy's eye popped completely out of its socket. At that point, he revealed his accomplice's name; then both men were killed. Years later, Tony Spilotro told this story to his friend Frank Cullotta. Spilotro was impressed by Nicoletti's reaction to the gory scene: "Boy, this is a heartless guy. He was eating pasta when Billy's eye popped out".

In the 1960s, Nicoletti was questioned by two FBI agents, including Agent William F. Roemer Jr., to see whether they could develop Nicoletti as an informant against the Outfit. According to Roemer, Nicoletti gave him the names of several car dealerships he worked at and was very cordial; apparently, all the employment leads checked out. But Nicoletti never flipped and never talked to the FBI again, though there was eventually talk in Chicago that Nicoletti had flipped.

It has been alleged that Nicoletti was involved in as many as 20 mob hits during his career as a hitman. In 2010, Playboy magazine published an article by Hillel Levin in which Nicoletti was implicated in the assassination of President John F. Kennedy by James Files, an inmate within the Illinois Department of Corrections, and Chauncey Marvin Holt.

Death

On March 29, 1977, Nicoletti was shot three times in the back of his head while waiting in his Oldsmobile in the parking lot of the Golden Horns Restaurant in suburban Northlake, Illinois. He was brought to the Northlake Community Hospital where he died six to seven hours later. Nicoletti's car was never turned off and consequently overheated and caught on fire, causing initial incorrect press reports that his car was firebombed. Nicoletti was due to testify before the House Select Committee on Assassinations at the time of his death. The same applies to George de Mohrenschildt who died on the exact same day.

According to Roemer, Chicago mob assassin Harry Aleman is the suspected hitman.

Nicoletti is buried at Mount Carmel Cemetery in Hillside, Illinois.

See also
List of unsolved murders

Notes

Further reading

 

1916 births
1977 deaths
1977 murders in the United States
Burials at the Bishop's Mausoleum, Mount Carmel Cemetery (Hillside)
Chicago Outfit mobsters
Criminals from Chicago
Deaths by firearm in Illinois
Male murder victims
Mafia hitmen
Gangsters from Chicago
Murdered American gangsters of Italian descent
Murdered American gangsters of Sicilian descent
Patricides
People associated with the assassination of John F. Kennedy
People murdered in Illinois
Torture in the United States
Unsolved murders in the United States